Craig Disher (born December 21, 1958, in Rolla, North Dakota, United States) is an American curler.

At the national level, he is a 1997 United States men's champion curler. Also he is a 1996 United States mixed silver medallist.

Teams

Men's

Mixed

Personal life
He started curling in 1970 at the age of 12.

He is married to Debbie; they have two children - daughter Kelsey and son Jaden.

Disher is employed as a farmer.

References

External links

Living people
1958 births
People from Rolette County, North Dakota
Sportspeople from North Dakota
American male curlers
American curling champions
Farmers from North Dakota